An erdstall is a type of tunnel found across Europe. They are of unknown origin but are believed to date from the Middle Ages. A variety of purposes have been theorized, including that they were used as escape routes or hiding places, but the most prominent theory is that they served a religious or spiritual purpose.

Etymology

Construction

There is only one narrow concealed entry point, with no second exit tunnel as is common with an escape tunnel system. Some tunnel systems feature loop tunnels at the end of a tunnel.

Classification
In his 2000 publication , Herbert Wimmer created a rough classification system for varying types of erdstall:

Type A has a single long gallery with slip passages and short side slopes
Type B has multiple levels connected at multiple places by vertical slip passages. Auxiliary construction tunnels have been found that were closed after completion. At the end of each tunnel, seating niches have been cut out or the tunnel is widened with a longer seating bench.
Type C has multiple horizontal slip passages and there is a round trip tunnel at the end or in the middle that is high enough to walk through upright.
Type D has multiple chambers that are connected through tunnels. The slip passages are mostly horizontal in this type.

Archaeology
There is almost no archaeological material to be found in the tunnels, although erdstall tunnels exist in abundance in Central Europe, with over 700 in Bavaria alone. This makes it highly unlikely that they were ever used as dwellings, such as a hiding place in times of war.

The archaeological evidence is so slim that even age determination is difficult. Coal from a fire pit at  has been dated between 1030 and 1210. Coal from a heading in  has been dated between the late 10th and mid-11th century. A slip passage at  has been enhanced with stones to make it narrower with the stone additions dated to between 1034 and 1268. Ceramics found in St. Agatha have been dated to the 12th century, which seems to be the latest date of usage.

Museums
Most erdstall sites are too narrow to be usable for general tourism. A bigger walkable site is the Erdstall Ratgöbluckn in Perg (Upper Austria) that is open to the public as part of the local museum of Perg. The Erdstall am Kapellenberg in Großkrut (Lower Austria) was opened in 2007 to visitors of the Erdstallmuseum Althöflein.

See also
  – Hindus believe that crawling through the tunnel will wash away all of one’s sins and thus attain freedom from rebirth.
  – souterrain structures in Cornwall of unknown usage.

References

External links

 – study group for erdstall tunnels
 – journal report on erdstall tunnels
 – "Unser Erdstall" - detailed report on the erdstall in Gaweinsteil (found in 2007)
 – more than 700 underground passages and menhirs

Tunnels
Subterranea (geography)
Open problems